YNW or ynw may refer to:

 YNW Melly (born Jamell Maurice Demons, 1999), an American rapper and singer
 YNW Bortlen (born Cortlen Malik Henry, 1999), an American rapper
 YNW, the National Rail code for Ynyswen railway station in Wales, UK
 Your News Wire, a former name of the website NewsPunch

 See also